S. arvensis may refer to:
 Sherardia arvensis, the field madder, a flowering plant species
 Sinapis arvensis, the wild mustard or charlock, a plant species
 Sonchus arvensis, the corn sow thistle, dindle, field sow thistle, gutweed, swine thistle, tree sow thistle or field sowthistle, a plant species
 Spergula arvensis, the corn spurry

See also
 Arvensis (disambiguation)